This article features a list of islands sorted by their name beginning with the letter J.

See also
List of islands (by country)
List of islands by area
List of islands by population
List of islands by highest point

J